Phylbert Angelli Ranollo Fagestrom (born October 17, 1987), professionally known as Bea Alonzo, is a Filipino actress. Alonzo first gained  recognition for the 2002 teleserye Kay Tagal Kang Hinintay. She is best known for her portrayals in the films One More Chance (2007), The Mistress (2012), Four Sisters and a Wedding (2013), and Eerie (2019). As of 2021, she is an exclusive artist of GMA Network.

Early life
Bea Alonzo was born as Phylbert Angelli Ranollo Fagestrom on October 17, 1987, in Rizal, to Philip Fagestrom and Mary Anne Ranollo. Alonzo's father is British. Her parents are separated. She has a younger brother on her mother's side. She finished elementary education in 2001 at the Jose Abad Santos Memorial School Quezon City. She attended The Fisher Valley College in Taguig, Ususan Elementary School in Ususan, and Colegio de Santa Ana in Taguig.

Career

In June 2008, Alonzo released her debut album The Real Me under Star Records. It was also in mid-2008 when it was announced that she would play the leading character Betty Pengson in the TV sitcom Yo Soy Betty La Fea, which originated from Colombia. The Philippines' version was entitled I Love Betty La Fea. The show premiered in September 2008 at the primetime slot; it ran for eight consecutive months.

In December 2011, Alonzo renewed her contract with ABS-CBN. She was set to do two movies under Star Cinema and a reunion drama, The Mistress, with her on-screen partner, John Lloyd Cruz. Alonzo starred in the 2014 international hit TV drama Sana Bukas pa ang Kahapon (Tomorrow Belongs To Me), opposite Paulo Avelino and Albert Martinez.

In 2019, Alonzo appeared in the horror film Eerie and the dramatic film Unbreakable. She also started pursuing writing for film in 2019 by enrolling in the writing workshop of Filipino screenwriter, journalist, novelist, and playwright Ricky Lee. This year, she was also included in the list of Variety.com and the International Film Festival & Awards Macao as among Asia's biggest stars poised for international stardom.

On July 1, 2021, GMA News announced that she transferred to GMA Network after almost 19 years under ABS-CBN.

Discography

Concert

 Together Again #StrongerTogether: A GMA Pinoy TV @ 17 Concert, LA, California, USA (2022)

Studio albums

Awards and nominations

Film

Television

Other awards

References

External links

GMA Network profile

1987 births
Living people
21st-century Filipino actresses
ABS-CBN personalities
GMA Network personalities
Actresses from Rizal
Filipino child actresses
Filipino film actresses
Filipino people of British descent
Filipino television actresses
Filipino women comedians
People from Cainta
People from Rizal
People from Taguig
Star Magic personalities
Tagalog people